SMA Negeri 3 Semarang, also SMAN 3 Semarang or SMA 3 Semarang, is a public high-school in Indonesia. The school campus is located at 149 Pemuda Road, Semarang, Central Java. Also known as Bodjong HS was established on 1 November 1877 or 1878 under Dutch colonial rule, as the Hogere Burgerschool for Semarang.

Principal 
In the history, there are some changes on the name of SMA Negeri 3 Semarang. Under Dutch colonial it is known as SMA A/C then it split as SMA A and SMA C, one became SMA Negeri 3 Semarang and the other became SMA Negeri 4 Semarang. SMA Negeri 4 Semarang then move to other location
 As SMA A/C
 Mr. Klareza Deotavian Ardeyanto M.Pd.
 Mr. Faisal Ibrahim Rabbani M.Pd.
 As SMA A
 Mrs. Riris Septiana Wardani
 Sardjono
 Maryono
 As SMA C
 Mrs. Prima Ari Kusuma Wardani
 As SMA 3
 BM. Ichwan
 Moch Joesoef Soediradarsono
 Drs. Arief Moechjidin
 As SMA 4
 Nursiyah
 Drs. Soekono
 As SMA 3 - 4
 Drs. S. Soewarto Muthalib (1971-1978)
 As SMA 3
 Drs. S. Soewarto Muthalib (1978-1980)
 Soetiman (1980-1989)
 Soerjono Djati, BA (1989-1991)
 H.M. Sukoco (1991-1995)
 Drs. Rachmat Mardjuki (1995-2000)
 Drs.H.Sardju Maheri, M.Pd. (2000- 2005)
 Drs. H.Soedjono, M.Si. (2005- 2009)
 Drs. Hari Waluyo, M.M. (2009- 2012)
 Drs. Bambang Niantomulyo, M.Pd. (2012- 2016)
 Drs. Wiharto, M.Si. (2016 - now)

References

Semarang
Buildings and structures in Semarang
Education in Central Java